Larry Snyder or Laurence Snyder may refer to:

Larry Snyder (athlete) (1896–1982), track & field athlete and coach
Laurence H. Snyder (1901–1986), pioneer in human genetics and president of the University of Hawaii
Larry Snyder (jockey) (1942–2018)